Open Air was BBC1's flagship programme for their new daytime service which began on 27 October 1986.

The programme was an on-air discussion forum for viewers to phone in their comments on the previous night's television. The series covered all television channels and would have programme makers and television management explaining their actions. Open Air also included features about current television and discussed all aspects of television and also tried to answer any questions which viewers had. Unlike similar programmes Right to Reply and Points of View, Open Air was transmitted live each weekday morning.

The programme was broadcast between September and May, initially between 11.35am and 12.20pm with a break for a news summary at midday, before moving to a single uninterrupted 55-minute slot for its second season, airing between 11.05am and 12noon. September 1987 also saw the introduction of an additional 15-minute early morning episode, initially aired at 8.40am following the end of Breakfast Time, before moving to 9.05am from January 1988.

Open Air ended on 18 May 1990, after three-and-a-half years and four series.

Presenters
 Pattie Coldwell
 Eamonn Holmes
 Gloria Hunniford
 Jayne Irving 
 John Mundy
 Mavis Nicholson
 Susan Rae
 Mike Shaft
 Bob Wellings

References

External links
 BFI.org

1986 British television series debuts
1990 British television series endings
BBC Television shows
British television talk shows
Television series about television